Maxville (Bourdon Farm) Aerodrome  is located  south southeast of Maxville, Ontario, Canada.

References

Registered aerodromes in Ontario